Sayef Fedoul (born January 7, 1996) is an Arab-Israeli footballer who plays for Hapoel Bnei Tuba-Zangariyye in the Liga Bet.

Fedoul made his debut for Netanya on December 26, 2015, in a league game against Hapoel Tel Aviv.

Honours
Liga Leumit
Winner (1): 2016-17

References

External links
 

1996 births
Living people
Israeli footballers
Maccabi Netanya F.C. players
Ironi Nesher F.C. players
Israeli Premier League players
Liga Leumit players
Footballers from I'billin
Arab citizens of Israel
Arab-Israeli footballers
Association football central defenders